Hermann Kopetz is a professor emeritus at Vienna University of Technology. He was named an IEEE Fellow in 1994 for contributions to fault-tolerant, real-time systems. He is a cofounder of the company TTTech.

Awards
Wilhelm Exner Medal (2005).

References

Academic staff of TU Wien
Living people
Fellow Members of the IEEE
Year of birth missing (living people)